The Glass House is a 2001 American psychological mystery thriller film directed by Daniel Sackheim and written by Wesley Strick. The film stars Leelee Sobieski, Diane Lane, Stellan Skarsgård, Bruce Dern, Kathy Baker, Trevor Morgan and Chris Noth.

The film received generally negative reviews and was a box office bomb, grossing only $23 million on a $30 million production budget. The main reason cited for the financial failure of the film was the fact that the film was released 3 days after the September 11 attacks.

Plot
Sixteen-year-old Ruby Baker and eleven-year-old brother Rhett lose their parents, David and Grace, in a car accident. Their  will is not recent but, per its terms, the children are placed under the guardianship of family neighbors from years ago, the childless couple Dr. Erin Glass and Terry Glass, who live in a large glass house in Malibu.

From early on, all is not well. The children have to share a room; they are no longer educated privately, and Rhett is allowed to play video games at all hours. Ruby is uncomfortable with Terry's sexual hints when they are alone, and later finds unlabeled pharmaceuticals and sees Erin injecting herself, although she claims it is for diabetes. Ruby tries to get the children's estate and trust fund lawyer Alvin Begleiter to accept her concerns, but visiting social worker Nancy Ryan is taken in by the couple's assurances.

In the trash, Ruby discovers a postcard from their maternal Uncle Jack and a letter from a private school indicating the Glasses unregistered the children, pocketing the $30,000+ tuition. Ruby also discovers Terry is in debt to loan sharks, gradually realizing the Glasses are after the siblings' $4 million trust fund.

Suspicious of her parents' deaths, Ruby discovers evidence of the Glasses' involvement from spotting a Saab similar to David's at Terry's shop, and reading an article stating Ruby's parents had been driving a BMW (later revealed to be registered to Terry's business). Moreover, Ruby is expelled from school because her essay, which Terry wrote for her as a favor, was plagiarized; Terry plans to send Ruby to a distant boarding school. After the loan sharks push him to pay off his debt, Terry tries to get money from the trustee, claiming it is to be used for the children's benefit. His request is denied and he is shown a copy of the un-registration letter from the school, previously faxed to the authority by Ruby, which alerts the trustee to doubt Terry's real purpose for the money.

That same night, Ruby steals Terry's car keys, wakes Rhett and drives off in his Jaguar, attempting to escape, but because of a mudslide, the police stop her and demand to see her license. Terry and Erin appear, talking the police into letting the children go. Back home, Ruby attempts to run away again but they knock her down and drug her. Terry then tells Erin they must get rid of her. Erin is overcome by guilt; she is permanently stripped of her medical license, due to her drug abuse being discovered by her employer, Dr. Weiss. Erin commits suicide by overdose and the next morning, both Ruby and Terry are devastated to find her dead. Terry locks the kids in the basement and sabotages his Jaguar, expecting them to reattempt escape and to consequently perish. The loan sharks (alerted by Ruby posing as Erin) appear at the house, kill Begleiter (who has come to confront Terry, revealing his complicity), repossess Terry's Jaguar and Ferrari, and insist on taking a ride. Overhearing Terry begging them to take the Volvo instead of the Jaguar, Ruby stabs the Volvo's tires, forcing them to drive away in the Jaguar with Terry in it. The car goes over a ledge and crashes, seemingly killing a loan shark and Terry.

Meanwhile, the children are picked up by a friendly cop. They pass the scene of the accident with the Ferrari and the kids see a body being covered up. Continuing on, he stops at the site of the other crash. Telling the children to stay in the car while he investigates, he finds the car and radios that there is one fatality. Terry knocks him out then, severely injured, he climbs to the road and staggers towards Ruby and Rhett, hiding a gun. Ruby gets into the driver's seat and, telling Rhett to put on his seatbelt, speeds into Terry, killing him.

The kids are last seen placing flowers at their parents' grave with their Uncle Jack, who hugs them and says that things will get easier. Ruby says that they already have, and the three leave together to go home to Chicago.

Cast

Release

Home media
The film was released on VHS and DVD on January 2, 2002. A Blu-ray version of the film has yet to be released in the US. The film finally debuted on the Blu-ray format for the first time on October 22, 2021 in Germany in a Blu-ray / DVD combo pack by Just Bridge Entertainment. The original cut of the film was reported to be 180 minutes long, with 74 minutes of footage missing from the theatrical cut. Kip Pardue played Leelee Sobieski's love interest in the original cut, though all of his scenes ended up on the cutting room floor. Of all the deleted footage, only two scenes managed to survive. They are included on the DVD as deleted scenes (listed below):

 After Ruby faints when she finds the cops at her house, she wakes up the next morning believing her parents' accident was only a nightmare. When she heads downstairs, the neighbors are there to tell her it wasn't. Ruby sits at the table and cries as the camera slowly pans away from her, as Rhett is told offscreen and runs away in devastation.
 Ruby and Rhett are seen at their parents' funeral burying their ashes at the cemetery.

There's also one scene in the trailer showing Ruby furiously ripping posters off her wall, which doesn't appear in the finished film or on home video.

Because of the film's critical and financial failure, the studio had little interest in keeping unused footage and the missing 74 minutes of footage have since been considered lost.

Reception

Box office
The film opened at number two in its opening weekend at the US box office, behind Hardball, in which Diane Lane also stars. The Glass House grossed $18,150,259 domestically and $5,469,350 overseas, grossing a total of $23,619,609. The film's production budget was $30 million, resulting in a box-office bomb.

Critical response
Rotten Tomatoes, a review aggregator, reports that the film received positive reviews by 21% of the 86 surveyed critics. The average rating was 4.23/10, and the consensus is: "Due to obvious plot twists and foreshadowing, The Glass House fails to thrill. By the end, it degenerates into ludicrousness." Roger Ebert rated the film 2 out of 4 stars and criticized the film's script. Writing in The New York Times, A. O. Scott called it unintentionally funny. Robert Koehler of Variety also called the film unintentionally funny and questioned why so many talented actors signed on to a poor script. Edward Guthmann, of the San Francisco Chronicle, criticized the film's violence and the timing of the release, which coincided with the September 11 attacks (in fact, for many critics it was the first film they saw after returning to work). In a more positive review, USA Todays Claudia Puig rated the film two out of four stars, calling it "eerily engrossing."

Sequel

A direct-to-video sequel, Glass House: The Good Mother, was released in 2006. The film did not feature any of the original characters and did not take place in the same house.

References

External links
 
 

2001 films
2000s crime thriller films
2000s mystery thriller films
2001 psychological thriller films
2000s teen films
Impact of the September 11 attacks on cinema
Political controversies in film
Film controversies
American crime thriller films
American mystery thriller films
American psychological thriller films
American teen films
American thriller drama films
Columbia Pictures films
Films about adoption
Films about child abuse
Films about orphans
Films about siblings
Films directed by Daniel Sackheim
Films produced by Neal H. Moritz
Films scored by Christopher Young
Films set in Malibu, California
Original Film films
Films set in a movie theatre
2001 directorial debut films
2000s English-language films
2000s American films